Inscriptions and historical sources assert that the Medieval Chola Emperor Rajendra Chola I sent a naval expedition to Indochina, the Indonesia and Malay Peninsula in 1025 in order to subdue Srivijaya. The Thiruvalangadu plates, the Leyden grant, and the Tamil stele of Rajendra Chola I are the principal sources of information about the campaign.

Sources 
The most detailed source of information on the campaign is the Tamil stele of Rajendra Chola I. The stele states:

The Thiruvalangadu plates, from the fourteenth year of Rajendra Chola I, mentions his conquest of Kadaram but does not go into the details. The first attempt by someone from outside India to identify the places associated with the campaign was made by epigraphist E. Hultzsch, who had published the stele in 1891. Hultzsch identified the principalities mentioned in the inscription with places ruled by the Pandyan Dynasty. In 1903, he rescinded his theory and stated that the stele described Rajendra Chola I's conquest of Bago in Burma. George Coedès' Le Royaume de Sri Vijaya published in 1918 after several years of research, rejected both the theories and provided the first convincing description of Rajendra Chola I's conquest of Southeast Asia.

Causes 
The relation between Srivijaya and the Chola dynasty of Tamilakam was initially friendly during the reign of Raja Raja Chola I. In 1006 CE a Srivijayan Maharaja from Sailendra dynasty, king Maravijayattungavarman, constructed the Chudamani Vihara in the port town of Nagapattinam. However, during the reign of Rajendra Chola I the relations deteriorate as the Chola Dynasty started to attack Srivijayan cities.

The causes of the hostility are obscure. While some scholars opine that the campaign was undertaken to establish Chola dominance over the seas of South-East Asia, other suggest that it might have been a war of plunder. It seems that the Khmer king Suryavarman I of the Khmer Empire requested aid from the powerful Chola Emperor Rajendra Chola I of the Chola dynasty against Tambralinga kingdom . After learning of Suryavarman's alliance with Rajendra Chola, the Tambralinga kingdom requested aid from the Srivijaya king Sangrama Vijayatungavarman. This eventually led to the Chola Empire coming into conflict with the Srivijiya Empire. The war ended with a victory for the Chola dynasty and Angkor Wat of the Khmer Empire, and major losses for the Sri Vijaya Empire and the Tambralinga kingdom.

Conquests 
 

 Sri Vijaya

The stele of Rajendra Chola I mentions Sri Vijaya as the first of the countries conquered. The Tamil inscription lists Sri Vijaya with "its jewelled wicket-gate" and "a gate of large jewels" as the first of the treasures captured by the fleet. The Sri Vijaya, mentioned in the inscriptions, has been identified by Coedès with the Sri Vijaya kingdom which rule from its base at Palembang in South Sumatra.

 Pannai
Pannai, with its bathing ghats, is second of the lands to be conquered by the naval fleet. Pannai has been identified as Panai or Pane, a city on the eastern coast of North Sumatra, located on the estuary of Panai River and Barumun River.

 Malaiyur
Malaiyur, with "its strong mountain", has been identified with Malayu in today Jambi province in Batanghari river valley, where a strong principality flourished at that time. Other suggestion is the southern part of the Malay peninsula

 Mayirudingam
Mayirudingam is believed to be the same as Ji-lo-ting listed by the Chinese writer Chau Ju-Kua among the dependencies of Sri Vijaya and is identified with the city of Chaiya in the centre of the Malay peninsula.

 Ilangasoka
The land of Ilangasoka (Langkasuka) mentioned in the inscriptions has been located on the east coast of the Malay Peninsula and is believed to be the same as the province of Ling-ya-sseu-kia mentioned in Chau Ju-Kua's list.

 Mapappalam
The epigraphist V. Venkayya identifies Mapappalam of the inscription with the city of Papphalama mentioned in the Mahavamsa. The place is believed to be located in the Talaing region of Lower Burma.

 Talaittakkolam
Talaittakkolam is believed to be the same as Takkola mentioned by Ptolemy as a trading emporion on the Golden Chersonese, and identified with Trang or the modern-day city of Takuapa in the Isthmus of Kra.

 Nakkavaram
Nakkavaram, mentioned in the records, has been identified by V. Venkayya with the Nicobar Islands.

 Kadaram
The place Kadaram (modern Kedah) mentioned in the stele is identified with the Kataha of Sanskrit literature and Kadaram of the Kalingattuparani and the Kiet-cha of the Chinese chronicles.

Results 

The Southeast Asia campaign intensified interactions between India and Southeast Asia. The campaign also led to the establishment of  diplomatic ties with China. The first Tamil embassy to the court of the Song Emperor was sent by Raja Raja Chola I in 1015. This was followed by a second embassy by his son, Rajendra Chola I, in 1033 and a third by Kulothunga Chola I in 1077. The Chola Empire did not establish its direct rule over South-East Asia though they might have levied a periodic tribute.

Traders from the Tamil country firmly established themselves over various parts of South-East Asia. A merchant guild was set up in Burma and another in Sumatra in 1088. Indian historian V. R. Ramachandra Dikshitar suggests that Tamil traders of the Chola period might have had a knowledge of Australia and Polynesia.

Notes

Bibliography 

 
 

Military history of Southeast Asia
1025 in Asia
Military campaigns involving the Chola Empire
Conflicts in 1025
History of the foreign relations of India
Naval battles involving Cholas